Journal of Communication Inquiry is a quarterly peer-reviewed academic journal that covers the field of communication. It is edited by graduate students in the School of Journalism and Mass Communication at the University of Iowa. The editor is Thomas P. Oates (University of Iowa). It was established in 1974 and is currently published by SAGE Publishing.

Abstracting and indexing 
Journal of Communication Inquiry is abstracted and indexed in:
 ComAbstracts
 EBSCO databases
 Gale Diversity Studies Collection
 Peace Research Abstracts Journal
 ProQuest
 Scopus
 Wilson Humanities Index/Abstracts

External links 
 

SAGE Publishing academic journals
English-language journals
Publications established in 1974
Quarterly journals
Communication journals